This article lists the winners and nominees for the Black Reel Award for Television for Outstanding Actor, Comedy Series. This category was first introduced in 2017 and won by Donald Glover for Atlanta. Glover and Don Cheadle are currently tied with the most wins with 2. Anthony Anderson is currently the most nominated actor with 5 nominations.

Winners and nominees
Winners are listed first and highlighted in bold.

2010s

2020s

Superlatives

Programs with multiple awards

2 awards
 Atlanta
 Black Monday

Performers with multiple awards

2 awards
 Don Cheadle (2 consecutive)
 Donald Glover (2 consecutive)

Programs with multiple nominations

5 nominations
 Black-ish

3 nominations
 Ballers
 The Last O.G.

2 nominations
 Atlanta
 Black Monday
 Dear White People

Performers with multiple nominations

5 nominations
 Anthony Anderson

3 nominations
 Dwayne Johnson
 Tracy Morgan

2 nominations
 Don Cheadle
 Donald Glover

Total awards by network
 FX – 2
 Showtime – 2
 ABC – 1

References

Black Reel Awards